Enn Nurmiste (born Nikolai Neuhaus; 13 July 1894 Tallinn – 3 March 1968 Tallinn) was an Estonian politician. He was a member of Estonian National Assembly.

References

1894 births
1968 deaths
Members of the Estonian National Assembly
Estonian military personnel of the Estonian War of Independence
Gulag detainees
Recipients of the Order of the White Star, 4th Class
University of Tartu alumni
Politicians from Tallinn